Mastung District is a district located in the northwest of Balochistan province, Pakistan. Prior to its creation as a separate district in  1991, Mastung was part of Kalat District.

Administration
The district consists of three Tehsils:
Dasht
Kardigap
Mastung

Prior to 2006, within these there were 12 union councils: Khadkocha, Ghulam Parenz, Karez Noth, Mastung-1, Mastung-2, Sorgaz, Dasht, Isplinji, Kanak, Shaikh Wasil, Kardigap and Soro. In 2006, one additional union council formed with the name of Alizai, bringing the total union councils to 13.

Demographics
At the time of the 2017 census the district had a population of 265,676, of which 137,504 were males and 128,169 females. Rural population was 230,679 (86.83%) while the urban population was 34,997 (13.17%). The literacy rate was 39.66% - the male literacy rate was 49.69% while the female literacy rate was 28.92%. 775 people in the district were from religious minorities.

At the time of the 2017 census, 85.93% of the population spoke Brahui, 8.00% Balochi and 3.02% Pashto as their first language.

Education 
According to the Pakistan District Education Rankings 2017, district Mastung is ranked at number 74 out of the 141 ranked districts in Pakistan on the education score index. This index considers learning, gender parity and retention in the district.

Literacy rate for 2014–15 of population 10 years and older in the district stands at 59% whereas for females it is only 38%.

Post primary access is a major issue in the district with 79% schools being at primary level. Compare this with high schools which constitute only 8% of government schools in the district. This is also reflected in the enrolment figures for 2016–17 with 15,842 students enrolled in class 1 to 5 and only 642 students enrolled in class 9 and 10.

Gender disparity is another issue in the district. Only 36% schools in the district are girls’ schools. Access to education for girls is a major issue in the district and is also reflected in the low literacy rates for females.

Moreover, the schools in the district lack basic facilities. According to Alif Ailaan district education rankings 2017, the district is ranked at number 107 out of the 155 districts of Pakistan for primary school infrastructure. At the middle school level, it is ranked at number 115 out of the 155 districts. These rankings take into account the basic facilities available in schools including drinking water, working toilet, availability of electricity, existence of a boundary wall and general building condition. 4 out of 5 schools do not have electricity in them. More than half the schools lack a toilet and 1 out 3 schools do not have a boundary wall. 3 out of 5 schools do not have clean drinking water.

Notable people
Malik Saeed Dehwar

See also
 2017 Mastung suicide bombing
 Mastung Valley
  Babri Tribe

References

Bibliography

External links

Mastung District at www.balochistan.gov.pk
 Pashtuns were once principal inhabitants of Mastung

 
Districts of Pakistan
Districts of Balochistan, Pakistan